Surya Narayan Singh  (20 April 1920 – ) was an Indian politician. He was elected to the Lok Sabha, the lower house of the Parliament of India from the Balia in Bihar as a member of the Communist Party of India. Singh's death was announced in the Lok Sabha on 26 February 1996.

References

External links
Official biographical sketch in Parliament of India website

1920 births
1990s deaths
Year of death missing
Communist Party of India politicians from Bihar
India MPs 1980–1984
India MPs 1989–1991
India MPs 1991–1996
Lok Sabha members from Bihar